Langerud (also Romanized as Langerūd, Langarūd, Langrūd, and Lankarūd; also known as Langrūn) is a village in Qanavat Rural District, in the Central District of Qom County, Qom Province, Iran. At the 2006 census, its population was 1,574, in 353 families.

References 

Populated places in Qom Province